Lady Caroline Blackwood (born Caroline Maureen Hamilton-Temple-Blackwood; 16 July 1931 – 14 February 1996) was an English writer, who was the eldest child of Maureen Constance Guinness and the 4th Marquess of Dufferin and Ava.

Blackwood's novels have been praised for their wit and intelligence, with one autobiography detailing her unhappy childhood.

Early life
Caroline Maureen Hamilton-Temple-Blackwood was born on 16 July 1931 at 4 Hans Crescent in Knightsbridge, her parents' London home. Her parents were Maureen Constance Guinness and Basil Hamilton-Temple-Blackwood, 4th Marquess of Dufferin and Ava.

Blackwood was, self-admitted, "scantily educated" at Rockport School in County Down and Downham School near Essex, among other schools.

In 1949, after a finishing school in Oxford, Blackwood was presented as a debutante at a ball held at Londonderry House.

Career
Blackwood's first job was with Hulton Press as a secretary, but she was soon given small reporting jobs by Claud Cockburn. In Paris she met Picasso (and reportedly refused to wash for three days after he drew on her hands and nails).

After marrying Lucian Freud, she became a figure in London's bohemian circles, the Gargoyle Club and Colony Room replacing Belgravia drawing rooms. She sat for several of Freud's portraits, including Girl in Bed. She was impressed by the vision of Freud and Francis Bacon and her later fiction was influenced by their view of humanity.

In the early 1960s, Blackwood began contributing to Encounter, London Magazine, and other periodicals on subjects such as beatniks, Ulster sectarianism, feminist theatre and New York free schools. According to Christopher Isherwood, "she is only capable of thinking negatively. Confronted by a phenomenon, she asks herself: what is wrong with it?" During the mid-1960s, she had an affair with Robert Silvers, the founder and co-editor of The New York Review of Books.

Her third husband, Robert Lowell, was an influence on her talents as a novelist. He encouraged her to write her first book, For All That I Found There (1973), the title of which is a line from the Percy French song "The Mountains of Mourne", and which includes a memoir of her daughter's treatment in a burns unit. Blackwood's first novel The Stepdaughter (1976) appeared three years later and received much acclaim. It won the David Higham Prize for best first novel. Great Granny Webster followed in 1977 and was partly derived from her own childhood, and depicted an old woman's destructive impact on her daughter and granddaughter. It was short-listed for the 1977 Booker Prize.

The Last of the Duchess was completed in 1980. A study of the relations between the Duchess of Windsor and her lawyer, Suzanne Blum; it could not be published until after Blum's death in 1995. Her third novel The Fate of Mary Rose (1981) describes the effect on a Kent village of the rape and torture of a ten-year-old girl named Maureen and is narrated by a historian whose obsessions destroy his domestic life. After this came a collection of five short stories, Good Night Sweet Ladies (1983), followed by her final novel, Corrigan (1984), which was the least successful.

Blackwood's later books were based on interviews and vignettes, including On The Perimeter (1984), which focused her attentions on the Greenham Common Women's Peace Camp at RAF Greenham Common in Berkshire, and In The Pink (1987), which was a book looking at the hunting and the hunt saboteur fraternities.

Published works
Blackwood had published 10 books.
 Blackwood, Caroline (1973). For All That I Found There. George Braziller. 
 Blackwood, Caroline (1974). The Fate of Mary Rose. Summit Books. 
 Blackwood, Caroline (1976). The Stepdaughter. Pocket Books. 
 Blackwood, Caroline (1977). Great Granny Webster. New York Review Books. 
 Blackwood, Caroline with Haycraft, Anna (1980). Darling, You Shouldn't Have Gone to So Much Trouble. Jonathan Cape. 
 Blackwood, Caroline (1983). Good Night Sweet Ladies. Penguin Books. 
 Blackwood, Caroline (1984). Corrigan. NYRB Classics. 
 Blackwood, Caroline (1984). On the Perimeter. Penguin Books. 
 Blackwood, Caroline (1987). In the Pink. Bloomsbury Publishing. 
 Blackwood, Caroline (1995). The Last of the Duchess. Pantheon Books. 
 Blackwood, Caroline (2010). Never Breathe a Word: The Collected Stories of Caroline Blackwood. Counterpoint.

Personal life
Blackwood was married three times, and had four children.

 Lucian Freud, married 9 December 1953, divorced 1958.
 Israel Citkowitz, married 15 August 1959, divorced 1972, three daughters; including Eugenia.
 Robert Lowell, married 21 October 1972, one son.

In 1957, Blackwood moved to New York City and studied acting at the Stella Adler school.

Ann Fleming, the wife of Ian Fleming, introduced Blackwood to Lucian Freud and the couple eloped in Paris on 9 December 1953.

By 1966, when Blackwood and Citkowitz's youngest, Ivana, was born, their marriage was over, although he continued to live nearby and helped raise their daughters until his death. During the mid-1960s, Blackwood had an affair with Robert Silvers, a founder and co-editor of The New York Review of Books, who stayed close to the family thereafter. According to Ivana, she and Silvers both suspected that he was her biological father. However, a deathbed admission by Blackwood revealed that Ivana's biological father was another boyfriend: the screenwriter Ivan Moffat, a grandson of actor-manager Sir Herbert Beerbohm Tree.

On 22 June 1978, Blackwood's eldest daughter with Citkowitz, Natalya, died from postural asphyxia due to a drug overdose, aged 17.

Blackwood and Lowell lived in London and at Milgate House in Kent. The sequence of poems in Lowell's The Dolphin (1973) provides a disrupted narrative of his involvement with Blackwood and the birth of their son (Lowell's friend Elizabeth Bishop strongly advised Lowell not to publish the book, advice he ignored). Lowell suffered from bipolar disorder, and his manic episodes prompted in Blackwood distress, confusion, feelings of uselessness, and fear about the effects on their children. In 1977, Lowell died, reportedly clutching one of Freud's portraits of Blackwood, in the back seat of a New York cab, on his way back to his former wife, the writer Elizabeth Hardwick.

In 1977, to avoid taxation, Blackwood left England and went to live in County Kildare, Ireland, in an apartment at the great Georgian mansion of Castletown House, which was owned by her cousin Desmond Guinness. Ten years later, in 1987, she returned to the United States, settling in a large house in Sag Harbor, Long Island, where, although her abilities were reduced by alcoholism, she continued to write; her work of that era includes two memoirs, of Princess Margaret and of Francis Bacon, published in The New York Review of Books in 1992.

Death
On 14 February 1996, Lady Caroline Blackwood died from cancer, at the Mayfair Hotel on Park Avenue in New York City, aged 64.

References

Further reading
Davenport-Hines, Richard. "Caroline Blackwood" in the Oxford Dictionary of National Biography, Oxford University Press.

External links
 Official Profile on National Portrait Gallery, London
 Lady Caroline Blackwood, Wry Novelist, Is Dead at 64 on New York Times

1931 births
1996 deaths
20th-century British novelists
20th-century British writers
Caroline
British biographers
British debutantes
British expatriates in Ireland
British expatriates in the United States
British memoirists
Daughters of British marquesses
Deaths from cancer in New York (state)
English artists' models
Guinness family
Freud family
People educated at Rockport School
People from Knightsbridge
People of Anglo-Irish descent